Apriona is a genus of longhorn beetles in the subfamily Lamiinae.

Species
The genus contains the following species:

Apriona ammiralis
Apriona aphetor
Apriona brunneomarginata
Apriona buruensis
Apriona chemsaki
Apriona cinerea
Apriona cylindrica
Apriona elsa
Apriona flavescens
Apriona germari
Apriona hageni
Apriona irma
Apriona jakli
Apriona jossoi
Apriona juheli
Apriona marcusiana
Apriona minettii
Apriona moratii
Apriona multigranula
Apriona neglecta
Apriona neglectissima
Apriona nobuoi
Apriona novaeguineae
Apriona pascoei
Apriona paucigranula
Apriona punctatissima
Apriona rixator
Apriona rugicollis
Apriona sublaevis
Apriona submaculosa
Apriona swainsoni
Apriona teocchii
Apriona tigris
Apriona trilineata
Apriona tuberosicollis
Apriona unidentata
Apriona vagemaculata

Batocerini
Cerambycidae genera